Emmanuel Sunu Songo'o (born 17 March 1966), commonly known as Manu Sunu, is a Togolese former footballer who played as an attacking midfielder for ASKO Kara and Gomido and internationally for Togo.

Due to an injury sustained at the age of 34, Manu enjoyed a relatively short but albeit successful playing career spanning just under twelve years.

Personal life
His son Gilles also became a professional football, and represents Togo internationally.

References

1966 births
Living people
Togolese people of Cameroonian descent
Togolese people of Nigerian descent
Togolese footballers
Togo international footballers
Sportspeople from Lomé
Association football midfielders
21st-century Togolese people